Srikakulam is a city and the headquarters of Srikakulam district in the Indian state of Andhra Pradesh.  census,. it has a population of 165,735. There are many other places of Buddhist Tourism such as Salihundam, Kalinga Patnam, Dabbaka Vaani Peta, Nagari Peta, Jagati Metta, Singupuram  etc. in Srikakulam District. 
The Buddhist heritage site of Salihundam has some unique features. It has a beautiful star atop a stupa, rock cut massive stupaas inside chaitya grihas, brick stupas with wheel pattern plan, votive stupas, inscriptions on the steps leading to the stupas and museum housing over two dozen sculpted statue and figurines of Buddha, Jain Teerthankars and other deities

Etymology 
The city was known as Chicacole before Indian Independence.

History 

Srikakulam or Chicacole is of great historical significance in the medieval and later history of Kalinga. The earliest history of Srikakulam dates back to the ages of the Eastern Ganga Dynasty. It falls under the direct rule of the Suryavanshis of Nandapur until its annexation by the Golconda Qutb Shahis. Under the Sultans of Golconda, Srikakulam became the headquarters of the North Andhra region and one officer called 'Fouzdar' was appointed to look after the administration. The rule of Golconda in the region ended in 1673 with a battle between the king of Jeypore, Viswambhar Dev-I and the Nawab of Chicacole.

Due to the weakening state of Golconda, the fouzdar of Chicacole adopted the title of Nawab and endeavored to establish an independent regime. However, he was defeated by Viswambhar Dev-I, who re-established the rule of Jeypore in the North Andhra regions.

Demographics 

 Census of India, the city had a population of 146,988. The total population constitute, 73,077 males and 73,911 females —a sex ratio of 1011 females per 1000 males. 11,607 children are in the age group of 1–6 years. The average literacy rate stands at 84.62%, with male literacy at 90.76% and female literacy at 78.61%, and a total of 96,744 literates, significantly higher than the national average of 73.00%.

The Urban agglomeration had a population of 147,015, of which males constitute 73,077, females constitute 73,911 —a sex ratio of 931 females per 1000 males and 12,741 children are in the age group of 0–6 years. There are a total of 115,061 literates with an average literacy rate of 85.71%.

Climate 
Srikakulam has a tropical savanna climate (Köppen climate classification Aw).

Governance

Civic administration 

Srikakulam Municipal Corporation is the civic body of the city, constituted as a municipality in the year 1856. It was upgraded to corporation on 9 December 2015.

The Srikakulam urban agglomeration constituents of the city include, Srikakulam municipality, census town of Balaga, fully out growths of Arasavalli, partly outgrowths of Kusulapuram, Thotapalem, Patrunivalasa and Patha Srikakulam (rural). While, Ponugutivalasa of Santhakavati mandal is now a part of Rajam Nagar Panchayat.

Politics 

Srikakulam is a part of Srikakulam (Assembly constituency) for Andhra Pradesh Legislative Assembly. Dharmana Pradsada Rao is the present MLA of the constituency from YSR Congress Party. It is also a part of Srikakulam (Lok Sabha constituency) which was won by Rammohan Naidu Kinjarapu of Telugu Desam Party.

Culture and tourism 

The Arasavalli Sun temple is the abode of Sun god, the idol of the temple was installed by sage Kasyapa's and is one of the two sun temples in the country.

Education 
The primary and secondary school education is imparted by government, aided and private schools of the School Education Department of the state. The medium of instruction followed by different schools are English, Telugu.

Transport 

The Andhra Pradesh State Road Transport Corporation operates bus services from Srikakulam bus station. National Highway 16 (India), a part of Golden Quadrilateral highway network, bypasses the city.

Srikakulam Road railway station(station code:CHE) is an Indian railway station in Amudalavalasa near to Srikakulam town of Andhra Pradesh. It lies on the Khurda Road-Visakhapatnam section of Howrah-Chennai main line and is administered under Waltair railway division of South Coast Railway zone.

Sports 

International athletes like Karnam Malleswari (weightlifting) and Korada Mrudula (running, 400 m) are from Srikakulam. Kodi Ram Murthy Stadium near Govt. Degree College is a multi-purpose sporting facility in the town. In 1991, an unofficial cricket match was played between Sunil Gavaskar XI and Kapil Dev XI with both the legends being a part of the game as well. The only swimming pool (maintained by SAAP) is located in Santhinagar.

See also 
 List of cities in Andhra Pradesh by population
 List of municipalities in Andhra Pradesh

References

External links 

 Srikakulam District Collectorate

 
Cities in Andhra Pradesh
District headquarters of Andhra Pradesh
Srikakulam district
Cities and towns in Srikakulam district